Sclerosciadium is a monotypic genus of flowering plant in the family Apiaceae. Its sole species is  Sclerosciadium nodiflorum, native to Morocco and Western Sahara. The species was first described in 1800 as Oenanthe nodiflora.

References

Apioideae
Monotypic Apioideae genera